Wanda Catherine D’Isidoro Arcolín (born October 20, 1977 in Boston, Massachusetts) is a Venezuelan actress. D'Isidoro was born to an American mother and a Sicilian father, who met when her mother was an actress. They married and moved to Venezuela, after she was born.

Career 
Her first appearance on television was in the years 1991/1992 when an advertisement of Malt Caracas a man threw in Benji and she was kissed by him when he almost reached the floor. Her charm and beauty allowed her to then enter Venevision.

Started in Venevision, in the "Circo de las Cómplices", where she participated in a competition called "Alice in Wonderland", until she had the opportunity to cheer on "El Club de los Tigritos". Previously, she served as model with Jalymar Salomón in the game show "La Caravana del Dinero".

In 2012, she starred as Priscilla in the Nickelodeon series, Grachi, and Verónica Baeza on El Rostro de la Venganza.

In 2013, she recorded a production of Telemundo starring as Bárbara Cano, (the main villain) in the soap Santa Diabla, which was released in August 2013 and share credits with Gaby Espino, Aaron Diaz, Carlos Ponce and Ximena Duque.

Filmography

Awards and nominations

References

1977 births
Living people
Actresses from Boston
American telenovela actresses
Venezuelan telenovela actresses
Venezuelan female models
Venezuelan expatriates in the United States
21st-century American women